Little Catwick is a hamlet in the East Riding of Yorkshire, England.

It forms part of the civil parish of Catwick.

References

Villages in the East Riding of Yorkshire